The siege of Lamia occurred in 322 BC between the Macedonians led by Antipater and a coalition of armies mostly from central Greece led by Leosthenes.

After Antipater was defeated at the Battle of Thermopylae he shut himself in the city of Lamia. Leosthenes approached the city and with his army fortified a camp,  dug up a deep ditch and constructed a palisade. Initially, Leosthenes would draw up his forces, and approach the city and directly challenge the Macedonians to battle. The Macedonians denied this challenge, prompting Leosthenes to launch daily attacks on the walls with his soldiers.

The Macedonians defended themselves from the daily attacks and were able to halt the Greeks' attacks, because of the abundance of missiles and protection from the walls. Since Leosthenes was unable to storm the city, he shut off all supplies entering the city, believing this would reduce the army because of hunger. He also built a wall and dug a deep, wide ditch, cutting off all escape routes for the Macedonians.

The Aetolians all returned to Aetolia, due to national business Leosthenes agreed, Antipater and his men exhausted due to the anticipation of famine. Antipater initiated an attack on the men digging the moat and a struggle occurred, Leosthenes in an attempt to aid his men, was struck in the head by a stone, he fainted and was dragged to camp and in three days' time he died.

References 

Lamia
322 BC
Lamia
Lamia